The Halls Head Western Open, also known as the Mandurah Classic, was a golf tournament in Australia.

History 
The tournament was founded in 1979 as the Mandurah Classic. The event was held at Mandurah Country Club in Halls Head, Mandurah, Western Australia. The event was managed by Tuohy and Associates, a golf management group run by Bob Tuohy, a former professional golfer. In the inaugural event, local resident Terry Gale came from behind in the final round to match the course record with a 66 (−6) and win by five shots. The following year, Gale repeated as champion.

In 1981 and 1982, the event became part of the PGA Tour of Australia. The purse increased significantly to A$30,000. The first two rounds were a neck and neck struggle between Bob Shaw and Colin Bishop with Terry Gale close behind. In the third round, however, Bishop and Shaw "faded" with over-par rounds. Gale, meanwhile, scored four consecutive birdies on the back nine for a five-under-par 67. He suddenly led by seven shots. In the final round, Shaw recorded a number of birdies on the back nine to reduce Gale's lead to two. However, he bogeyed the 17th and Gale finished two strokes ahead. It was his third consecutive victory in the event. The following year, Gale was among the favorites, and held the lead after the first three rounds. However, in the final round he failed to make a birdie, and Mike Cahill took advantage, shooting a 70 to win by a stroke.

Winners

References 

Golf tournaments in Australia
Golf in Western Australia
Recurring sporting events established in 1979
Recurring sporting events disestablished in 1982
1979 establishments in Australia
1982 disestablishments in Australia